Feargus Michael Flood (2 July 1928 – 10 September 2022) was an Irish judge. A member of the High Court from 1991 to 2000, he chaired the Flood Tribunal which investigated allegations of corrupt payments to politicians.

Early life
Flood was born in Ballyshannon, County Donegal in 1928. The son of a banker, he was educated at Castleknock College, University College Dublin and King's Inns.

Career
Flood spent the earlier parts of his legal career practising as a junior and senior counsel in Monaghan, Cavan and Dundalk. He was appointed to the High Court in 1991. Flood became chairman of the Planning and Payments Tribunal in November 1997. Known as the Flood Tribunal, it was originally set up to probe allegations of corruption against former Fianna Fáil minister Ray Burke but was extended to cover alleged corruption involving land developers and Dublin politicians as well as former assistant Dublin city and county manager George Redmond. Flood stepped down as chairman in 2003.

Personal life and death
Flood met his future wife, Anna Maria, on a holiday in Italy. They married in 1963 and had three children. Flood suffered from Alzheimer's disease in later life and died on 10 September 2022, at the age of 94.

References

1928 births
2022 deaths
High Court judges (Ireland)
Irish barristers
Alumni of University College Dublin
Alumni of King's Inns
People educated at Castleknock College